Events in the year 1870 in Argentina.

Incumbents
 President: Domingo Faustino Sarmiento
 Vice President: Adolfo Alsina

Governors
 Buenos Aires Province: Emilio de Castro y Rocha 
 Cordoba: Félix de la Peña
 Mendoza Province: Nicolás Villanueva (until 16 October); Arístides Villanueva (from 16 October)
 Santa Fe Province: Mariano Cabal

Vice Governors
Buenos Aires Province: vacant

Events
1 March - End of the Paraguayan War.  Following this, Argentina seeks to enforce one of the secret clauses of the Treaty of the Triple Alliance, which would have permitted it to annex a large portion of the Gran Chaco region.  The Brazilian government, wishing to maintain Paraguay as a buffer with Argentina, it rejects the Argentine proposal.

Births
 21 February – Victor Mercante, educationist (died 1934)

Deaths
 12 March – Pastor Obligado, lawyer, Governor of the secessionist State of Buenos Aires 1853–1858 (born 1818)
 11 April – Justo José de Urquiza, politician and general (born 1801)

References

 
History of Argentina (1852–1880)
1870s in Argentina
Years of the 19th century in Argentina